Megachile commixta is a species of bee in the family Megachilidae. It was described by Pasteels and Blaine H. Goodposts in 1970.

References

Commixta
Insects described in 1970